The mechanical philosophy is a form of natural philosophy which compares the universe to a large-scale mechanism (i.e. a machine). The mechanical philosophy is associated with the scientific revolution of early modern Europe. One of the first expositions of universal mechanism is found in the opening passages of Leviathan by Thomas Hobbes, published in 1651.

Some intellectual historians and critical theorists argue that early mechanical philosophy was tied to disenchantment and the rejection of the idea of nature as living or animated by spirits or angels. Other scholars, however, have noted that early mechanical philosophers nevertheless believed in magic, Christianity and spiritualism.

Mechanism and determinism 
Some ancient philosophies held that the universe is reducible to completely mechanical principles—that is, the motion and collision of matter. This view was closely linked with materialism and reductionism, especially that of the atomists and to a large extent, stoic physics. Later mechanists believed the achievements of the scientific revolution of the 17th century had shown that all phenomena could eventually be explained in terms of "mechanical laws": natural laws governing the motion and collision of matter that imply a determinism.  If all phenomena can be explained entirely through the motion of matter under physical laws, as the gears of a clock determine that it must strike 2:00 an hour after striking 1:00, all phenomena must be completely determined, past, present or future.

Development of the mechanical philosophy

The natural philosophers concerned with developing the mechanical philosophy were largely a French group, together with some of their personal connections. They included Pierre Gassendi, Marin Mersenne and René Descartes. Also involved were the English thinkers Sir Kenelm Digby, Thomas Hobbes and Walter Charleton; and the Dutch natural philosopher Isaac Beeckman.

Robert Boyle used "mechanical philosophers" to refer both to those with a theory of "corpuscles" or atoms of matter, such as Gassendi and Descartes, and those who did without such a theory. One common factor was the clockwork universe view. His meaning would be problematic in the cases of Hobbes and Galileo Galilei; it would include Nicolas Lemery and Christiaan Huygens, as well as himself. Newton would be a transitional figure. Contemporary usage of "mechanical philosophy" dates back to 1952 and Marie Boas Hall.

In France the mechanical philosophy spread mostly through private academies and salons; in England in the Royal Society. In England it did not have a large initial impact in universities, which were somewhat more receptive in France, the Netherlands and Germany.

Hobbes and the mechanical philosophy
One of the first expositions of universal mechanism is found in the opening passages of Leviathan (1651) by Hobbes; the book's second chapter invokes the principle of inertia, foundational for the mechanical philosophy. Boyle did not mention him as one of the group; but at the time they were on opposite sides of a controversy. Richard Westfall deems him a mechanical philosopher.

Hobbes's major statement of his natural philosophy is in De Corpore (1655). In part II and III of this work he goes a long way towards identifying fundamental physics with geometry; and he freely mixes concepts from the two areas.

Descartes and the mechanical philosophy
Descartes was also a mechanist. A substance dualist, he argued that reality is composed of two radically different types of substance: extended matter, on the one hand, and immaterial mind, on the other. He identified matter with the spatial 
extension which is its only clear and distinct idea, and consequently denied the existence of vacuum.
Descartes argued that one cannot explain the conscious mind in terms of the spatial dynamics of mechanistic bits of matter cannoning off each other. Nevertheless, his understanding of biology was mechanistic in nature:

"I should like you to consider that these functions (including passion, memory, and imagination) follow from the mere arrangement of the machine’s organs every bit as naturally as the movements of a clock or other automaton follow from the arrangement of its counter-weights and wheels." (Descartes, Treatise on Man, p.108)

His scientific work was based on the traditional mechanistic understanding which maintains that animals and humans are completely mechanistic automata. Descartes' dualism was motivated by the seeming impossibility that mechanical dynamics could yield mental experiences.

Beeckman and the mechanical philosophy
Isaac Beeckman's theory of mechanical philosophy described in his books Centuria and Journal is grounded in two components: matter and motion.  To explain matter, Beeckman relied on  atomism philosophy which explains that matter is composed of tiny inseparable particles that interact to create the objects seen in life.  To explain motion, he supported the idea of inertia, a theory generated by Isaac Newton.

Newton's mechanical philosophy
Isaac Newton ushered in a weaker notion of mechanism that tolerated the action at a distance of gravity. Interpretations of Newton's scientific work in light of his occult research have suggested that he did not properly view the universe as mechanistic, but instead populated by mysterious forces and spirits and constantly sustained by God and angels. Later generations of philosophers who were influenced by Newton's example were nonetheless often mechanists. Among them were Julien Offray de La Mettrie and Denis Diderot.

The mechanist thesis
The French mechanist and determinist Pierre Simon de Laplace formulated some implications of the mechanist thesis, writing:

Criticism

A study of mechanical philosophy shows that although this approach includes a wide range of useful observational and principled data, it has not adequately explained the world and its components, and there are weaknesses in its definitions. Among the criticisms made of this philosophy are:

 Experts in religious studies have criticized the philosophy that God's intervention in the management of the world seems unnecessary.
 Newton's mechanical philosophy, with all its positive effects on human life, ultimately leads to Deism.
 It is a stagnant worldview that cannot explain God's constant presence and favor in the world.
 At the height of this philosophy, God was viewed as a skilled designer, and for him the mental structure and human morality were conceived.
 The assumption that God tuned the world like a clock and left it to its own devices is in clear conflict with the God of the Bible, who is at all times directly and immediately involved in his creation.
 This philosophy abandons concepts such as essence, accident, matter, form, Ipso facto and potential that are used in ontology, and denies the involvement of transcendental affairs in the management of this world.
 This philosophy is incapable of explaining human spiritual experiences and the immaterial realms of the world.

See also

Causality
French materialism
Mechanism (philosophy)
Necessitarianism
Philosophy of physics

References

External links
 An overview of attempts to define "life"
 "The Problem of Mechanism" by David L. Schindler (from Beyond Mechanism) - contrasts the Aristotelian and Cartesian views of nature and how the latter engendered the mechanical philosophy

Historiography of science
17th century in science
Natural philosophy
Naturalism (philosophy)
Metaphysical theories
Theory of mind
Determinism
Materialism
Cognitive science